The following television stations in the United States brand as channel 8 (though neither using virtual channel 8 nor broadcasting on physical RF channel 8):

 WDAY-DT2 in Fargo, North Dakota
 WTOK-DT3 in Meridian, Mississippi

08 branded